Ginny Klevorn (born 1958/1959) is an American politician serving in the Minnesota House of Representatives since 2019. A member of the Minnesota Democratic–Farmer–Labor Party (DFL), Klevorn represents District 44A in the western Twin Cities metropolitan area, which includes the city of Plymouth and parts of Hennepin County, Minnesota.

Early life, education, and career
Klevorn's family has lived in Belgium and Brazil. In Brazil, she volunteered for Catholic relief agencies in the slums of cities. Klevorn attended Saint Louis University, graduating with a Bachelor of Science in business administration. She is a professional mediator.

Klevorn served on the Minnesota Office of Lawyers Professional Responsibility Board and the Wayzata School District Legislative Action Committee. She was a guardian ad litem in the 4th Judicial District juvenile court.

Minnesota House of Representatives
Klevorn was elected to the Minnesota House of Representatives in 2018 and has been reelected every two years since. She first ran in 2016, losing to five-term Republican incumbent Sarah Anderson. She challenged Anderson again in 2018 and won, in a race that generated the most outside spending that year.

Klevorn is chair of the State and Local Government Finance and Policy Committee, and sits on the Commerce Finance and Policy, Ethics, Higher Education Finance and Policy, and Ways and Means Committees. From 2019-20, Klevorn served as vice chair of the State Government Finance Committee. She was vice chair of the Redistricting Committee from 2021-22.

Klevorn authored legislation to form a citizen advisory redistricting commission to draw legislative boundaries, rather than relying on the courts as Minnesota had in multiple redistricting cycles. She also wrote a bill to prohibit evictions from assisted-living homes during public health emergencies like COVID-19.

Electoral history

Personal life
Klevorn and her husband, Tom, have three children. She resides in Plymouth, Minnesota. She is Catholic.

References

External links

 Official House of Representatives website
 Official campaign website

1950s births
Living people
People from Plymouth, Minnesota
Saint Louis University alumni
Democratic Party members of the Minnesota House of Representatives
21st-century American politicians
21st-century American women politicians
Women state legislators in Minnesota
Catholics from Minnesota